Perfumed Ball is a 1996 Brazilian film directed by Lírio Ferreira and Paulo Caldas. Starring Duda Mamberti and Luiz Carlos Vasconcelos, it shows the history of how Benjamin Abrahão befriended Lampião, the leader of Cangaço, and filmed his crimes—a feat Brazilian army was not able to. It used footages took in 1936 for Abrahão's 1959 film Lampião, o Rei do Cangaço.

Cast
Duda Mamberti as Benjamin Abrahão
Luiz Carlos Vasconcelos as Lampião
Aramis Trindade as lieutenant Lindalvo Rosas
Chico Diaz as colonel Zé de Zito
Joffre Soares as Padre Cícero
Cláudio Mamberti as colonel João Libório
Germano Haiut as Ademar Albuquerque
Zuleica Ferreira as Maria Bonita

Reception
It entered the 1996 Festival de Brasília, where it won the Best Film, Best Newcomer Director, Best Art Direction (Adão Pinheiro), Best Supporting Actor (Aramis Trindade) awards, and shared the Critic's Choice Award with Um Céu de Estrelas. It was released on Brazilian theatres on July 26, 1997. It was shown at the 1997 Cannes Film Festival, at the 1997 Toronto International Film Festival, at the 1998 Chicago Latino Film Festival, and won the Coral Prize for Bestil Film Poster at the 19th Havana Film Festival. and is considered an important mark in Pernambuco's cinema industry, being one of the Pernambuco's first films to be acclaimed by international critics. For example, Deborah Young of Variety said it "has a deliberately naive look that keeps it fresh, plus amusing dialogue and cast." She especially praised its "imaginative camera style" as it "uses a quasi-expressionist palette and camera angles".

References

External links

1996 films
1996 drama films
Brazilian drama films
Films set in the 1930s
Films set in Brazil
Films shot in Recife
1990s Portuguese-language films
1996 directorial debut films